The E 231 is a European B class road in the Netherlands, connecting the cities of Amsterdam and Amersfoort.

The highway is maintained by Rijkswaterstaat.

Route description 

 in Amsterdam
 in Diemen
 in Muiderberg
 near Hilversum
 in Amersfoort

History 
The route that E 231 follows was originally called E 35 in 1950 in the Declaration on the Construction of Main International Traffic Arteries. That route started in Amsterdam, passed by Amersfoort, E 231's current eastern terminus, Groningen and Bremen, and ended in Hamburg. In the 1950 version of that declaration, there were no routes numbered E 230 and E 231 yet.
In 1975, E 230, a new route in the system, was defined and proposed as a road between Amsterdam and Amersfoort, the same route as it follows today. The 1975 version of E 231 followed today's E 232's route from Amersfoort to Groningen. E 35 was also laid down on a new course, running from Hook of Holland, passing by Rotterdam, Utrecht, Oberhausen, Cologne, and Basel, to Rome. These plans were put into force on 15 March 1983. In 1987, E 230, defined in 1975, was renumbered to E 231. E 231 was renumbered to E 232. E 35 was also rerouted again, now starting in Amsterdam, but following the same route once arrived in Utrecht. 

In 1950, when E 35 was proposed, much of the underlying road wasn't constructed yet. The first part of the motorway to be completed was the Merwedebrug in 1933, now replaced with the Muiderbrug, with only one lane in each direction. Before 1942, construction started on embankments from Baarn to Amersfoort, but construction was discontinued due to World War II. In 1948 planning was continued and in 1952 Rijksweg 1, now also known as A1, was opened between Baarn and E 231's current eastern terminus Hoevelaken, which was merely a roundabout back then, compared to the cloverleaf interchange that is located there now. That part of the road had one lane in each direction and at grade intersections, but was already upgraded to have grade separated intersections in 1953.

Exit list

See also

References

External links 
 UN Economic Commission for Europe: Overall Map of E-road Network (2007)

International E-road network
231
Motorways in North Holland
Motorways in Utrecht (province)
Transport in Amsterdam
Amersfoort